Anthony Carl Knudsen (December 13, 1874 – May 20, 1931) was an American businessman and politician.

Knudsen was born in Denmark and emigrated to the United States settling in Storsen, Cottonwood County, Minnesota. He worked for the Westbrook Mutual Fire Insurance Company and was the company's secretary. Knudsen served in the Minnesota House of Representatives from 1923 until his death in 1931 and was a Republican. He died in Cottonwood County, Minnesota while still in office.

References

1874 births
1931 deaths
People from Cottonwood County, Minnesota
Danish emigrants to the United States
Businesspeople from Minnesota
Republican Party members of the Minnesota House of Representatives